The Battle of Tejo took place in July 1384, in the Tagus river (Tejo in Portuguese), between a Portuguese naval force of 34 ships (5 of which were major vessels) with the objective of supplying the besieged city of Lisbon with much needed supplies and the Castilian fleet led by Sanchez de Tovar. Although the Portuguese lost three ships (Castilian casualties are unknown), Portuguese success in reaching Lisbon and breaking the blockade with much needed supplies was a major victory for Portugal. The Castilians would later retreat from the siege.

See also
History of Portugal
John I of Portugal
Kingdom of Portugal
Treaty of Windsor (1386)
João das Regras
Hundred Years War

Notes

References
Fernão Lopes, Crónica de D. João I, Livraria Civilização, Porto, 1945, Vol. I, pp 233, 239, 244, 250, 254, 256, 259
Ignacio da Costa Quintella, Annaes da Marinha Portugueza, Academia Real das Sciencias, Lisboa, 1839, Tomo I, p. 45
Tancredo de Morais, História da Marinha Portuguesa, Clube Militar Naval, Lisboa, 1940, p. 185
António Rodrigues Pereira, História da Marinha Portuguesa, Escola Naval, Lisboa, 1983, Parte I, p. 147
Oliveira Martins, Vida de Nun'Álvares, Parceria António Maria Pereira, Lisboa, 1944, p. 202
Cesáreo Fernandez Duro, La Marina de Castilla, EDITMEX, Madrid, 1995, p. 148
Joseph Alvarez de la Fuente, Sucession Real de España, Herderos de Francisco del Hierro, Madrid, 1735, Parte Tercera, p. 157

1384 in Europe
Tejo 1384
Tejo 1384
the Tejo
the Tejo